Jürg Capol (born 2 July 1965) is a Swiss cross-country skier who competed from 1988 to 1994 and is marketing director for the International Ski Federation (FIS) . His best finish at the Winter Olympics was fourth in the 4 × 10 km relay at Calgary in 1988 while his best individual finish was 44th in the 50 km event at Lillehammer in 1994.

At the 1993 FIS Nordic World Ski Championships in Falun, Capol earned his best finish of 51st in the 10 km + 15 km combined pursuit event. His best World Cup finish was 13th in a 30 km event in the Soviet Union in 1988.

Capol was the FIS race director for cross-country skiing between 2007 and 2016, when he was promoted to marketing director for all FIS sports.

Cross-country skiing results
All results are sourced from the International Ski Federation (FIS).

Olympic Games

World Championships

World Cup

Season standings

Notes

External links

Olympic 4 x 10 km relay results: 1936-2002 

1965 births
Cross-country skiers at the 1988 Winter Olympics
Cross-country skiers at the 1992 Winter Olympics
Cross-country skiers at the 1994 Winter Olympics
Living people
Swiss male cross-country skiers
Olympic cross-country skiers of Switzerland
People from Chur
Sportspeople from Graubünden